Mahaul Theek Hai is a 1999 Indian Punjabi language comedy film directed by filmmaker Jaspal Bhatti. The English subtitled version is called The Atmosphere Is Right.

Plot

Mahaul Theek Hai (meaning 'the situation is okay') is a record setting Punjabi film. It is a comedy satire about corruption in system and working style of police force in India.  The plot is a story where boy (Smeep Kang) meets girl (Chandni Toor). The hero's brother Raj Babbar, is involved with an illegal businessman. The heroine's father Kulbhushan Kharbanda is cheated of land by his own brother and has become drunk. He is made to take blame of killing a political person in return for money so that police can close the file. While the real murderer B.N.Sharma who later arrives to take the blame so as to make his mark in crime world is portrayed as madman to hide the mischief done. Played by director and satirist Jaspal Bhatti, the villain of the film is a corrupt SSP (police superintendent) who misuses his authority to threaten people and hide his own excesses.  His love interest is played by Bhatti's real life wife (Savita Bhatti). Shot mainly in the northern India city of Chandigarh, the story uses a simple plotline to create its comedy. Every situation which should seem serious is filled with the incessant jokes and humour which are Bhatti's trademark.

Cast 

 Smeep Kang
 Yograj Singh
 Jaspal Bhatti	
 Raj Babbar
 Jaswinder Bhalla
 Daljit Kaur
 Asha Sharma
 Kulbhushan Kharbanda
 Navin Nischol
 Chandni Toor
 B.N. Sharma
 Vivek Shauq
 Sunil Grover
 Arminder Singh

Soundtracks 

The soundtrack for Mahaul Theek Hai was produced by H. M. Singh and released 12 February 1999 in the Punjabi language.

References

External links 

 
 Times of India: "Jaspal Bhatti's new comedy flick"
 Heritage.co.uk: Jaspal Bhatti biography (halfway down page)
 Jaspal Bhatti Film School - MAD Arts
 Tribune India: "Regional sentiment is running high"
 Indian Express: "Jaspal Bhatti set to produce Hindi films"
 Indian Express: "Bhatti's satire on Punjab police"
 Indian Cinema News: "Jaspal Bhatti goes 'MAD' with film school"

1999 films
Punjabi-language Indian films
1990s Punjabi-language films